Lucky Bastard may refer to:
 Lucky Bastard (2009 film), a drama film
 Lucky Bastard (2013 film), a found footage horror film

See also
 Lucky Bastards, an album by Peter Pan Speedrock